KD Laksamana Hang Nadim (F134) is the lead ship of Laksamana-class corvette currently in service with the Royal Malaysian Navy. She are currently serving in the 24th corvette Squadron of the Royal Malaysian Navy. She is based on the Fincantieri Type 550 corvette design.

Development

The Laksamana-class corvettes of the Royal Malaysian Navy are modified s built by Fincantieri, Italy. They were originally ordered by Iraqi Navy in February 1981. The corvettes were never delivered to Iraq and instead refitted and sold to Malaysia in mid 1990s.

Service history
Laksamana Hang Nadim were originally ordered by the Iraqi Navy as Khalid Ibn Al Walid (F216). Her keel was laid down on 3 June 1982, launched on 5 July 1983 and she was completed in 1987. Upon her completion, Khalid Ibn Al Walid was laid up at Muggiano due to trade embargo during Iran–Iraq War that prevented her from being delivered to Iraq. She was finally released for delivery in 1990, but as Iraq was again embargoed following its invasion of Kuwait, the ship was kept laid up by Fincantieri. It was proposed that she would be requisitioned by Italian Navy or sold to either Morocco or Colombia.

Royal Malaysian Navy signed a contract with Fincantieri for Khalid Ibn Al Walid and her sister Saad Ibn Abi Wakkad on 26 October 1995. She and her sister were refitted at Muggiano and later arrived in Malaysia in September 1997. The ship was commissioned as KD Laksamana Hang Nadim on 28 July 1997. After served for a long time in Royal Malaysian Navy, it was confirmed that she and other sister ships will be upgrade to extend their service life.

References

 
 
 

Corvette classes
Laksamana-class corvettes
Corvettes of Malaysia
Ships built by Fincantieri
1983 ships